Michael B. Goldman is an American diplomat who served as the chargé d’affaires ad interim to Australia between January 20, 2021, and July 25, 2022.

Early life and education 
Goldman earned a Ph.D. and MA in political science from the University of California, Berkeley and an undergraduate degree in international politics from Georgetown University.  He completed his dissertation research on a Fulbright scholarship at the Universiti Sains Malaysia in Penang, Malaysia.

Career 
Goldman arrived in Canberra in March 2020 as Deputy Chief of Mission, after three years at the U.S Embassy in Suva, Fiji, where he served as Charge d’Affaires (2018-2019) with responsibility for relations with the nations of Fiji, Kiribati, Nauru, Tonga, Tuvalu.

Goldman joined the State Department in 2000. He recently served in Washington as Deputy and Acting Director for China and Mongolia in the Bureau of East Asian and Pacific Affairs (2015-2017). Previous assignments include Kathmandu (2012-2015), where he was Political and Economic Counselor; Hanoi (2008-2011) and Tashkent (2002-2005) as a political officer; and Taipei (2000-2002) as a consular officer, as well as an earlier stint on the China Desk (2005-2007). He's the recipient of several State Department honors, including recognition as the Department's outstanding human rights officer for his work to combat torture and safeguard vulnerable NGOs in Uzbekistan.

Personal life 
Goldman speaks Mandarin Chinese, and at one time or another has also been fluent in Nepali, Vietnamese, Russian, and Indonesian. He has three children and is married to USAID Foreign Service Officer Brett Jones.

Prior to joining the State Department, Goldman worked as a dock worker on an oyster farm in Puget Sound and as an adjunct professor of political science at San Francisco State University.

References

Ambassadors of the United States to Fiji
Ambassadors of the United States to Nauru
Ambassadors of the United States to Kiribati
Ambassadors of the United States to Tonga
Ambassadors of the United States to Tuvalu
Living people
Year of birth missing (living people)
San Francisco State University faculty
University of California, Berkeley alumni
Georgetown University Graduate School of Arts and Sciences alumni
21st-century American diplomats